Aurelio Terrazas (28 April 1904 – 22 September 1984) was a Mexican long-distance runner. He competed in the marathon at the 1928 Summer Olympics.

References

1904 births
1984 deaths
Athletes (track and field) at the 1928 Summer Olympics
Mexican male long-distance runners
Mexican male marathon runners
Olympic athletes of Mexico
Sportspeople from Chihuahua (state)
20th-century Mexican people